Falfurrias High School is a public high school located in Falfurrias, Texas (USA) and classified as a 3A school by the UIL. It is part of the Brooks County Independent School District located in northern Brooks County which serves students county-wide. In 2015, the school was rated "Met Standard" by the Texas Education Agency.

High school aged students living in La Gloria Independent School District may attend Falfurrias High or Premont High of Premont Independent School District.

Athletics
The Falfurrias Jerseys compete in the following sports 

Baseball
Basketball
Cross Country
Football
Golf
Powerlifting
Softball
Tennis
Track and Field
Volleyball

State Titles
Baseball 
1991(3A)
Boys Cross Country 
1972(B), 1973(B), 1980(4A)
Boys Track 
1949(1A)

References

External links
 

Public high schools in Texas